Nickelodeon Animated Shorts Program is a variety project that was launched in 2012, where people make animated shorts at Nickelodeon Animation Studio for shows to send to Nickelodeon and Nick Jr. Since this project was launched, the TV series Breadwinners started in 2014, along with The Loud House in 2016, and the short-form series MooseBox and Sharkdog in 2018.

List of shorts for editions

Nickelodeon Animated Shorts Program

2012–2013

2013–2014

2014–2015Nick Picks Global Shorts Finalists | Animation Magazine

2015–2016

2016–2017

2017–2018

Nick Jr. Animated Shorts Program

2014–2015

2015–2016

2016–2017

2018–2019

See also
 Cartoon Network Shorts Department - the Cartoon Network counterpart of the program.

References

External links
 Official Facebook page
 Official Tumblr page
 Nick Animated Shorts playlist on YouTube

Animated Shorts Program
American animated short films
2012 establishments